Mandisa Muriel Lindelwa Maya Mlokoti (born March 20, 1964) is the first female  South African Deputy Chief Justice. She is also the first female  jurist who has served as President of the Supreme Court of Appeal of South Africa (SCA) since 26 May 2017 until 31 August 2022 and the first female chancellor of University of Mpumalanga since 1 July 2021. She had previously served as a judge in the Mthatha High Court, as a puisne judge of the SCA and as Deputy President of the SCA, as well as holding acting positions in various courts.

On 3 May 2022, Maya accepted the nomination by President Cyril Ramaphosa to become Deputy Chief Justice of South Africa. She assumed office on 1 September 2022.

Early life and education
Mandisa Maya was born in Tsolo, Eastern Cape on March 20, 1964, the oldest of six children to two teachers. She grew up in King William's Town in the former Ciskei Bantustan (homeland) under apartheid, and matriculated from St John's College. Mthatha and went on to obtain three degrees in law from the universities of the Transkei, the University of Natal and the Duke University in the United States from the years 1986 to 1990.

Career 
Maya has worked as a legal clerk at Dazana Mafungo Inc. in Mthatha from 1987 to 1988, before becoming an interpreter and prosecutor at The Magistrate's Court in Mthatha. She was then an assistant State Law Adviser from 1991 to 1993, before doing her pupillage at the Johannesburg Bar in 1993. She spent some time in the US, at the Woman's Legal Defense Fund in Washington, D.C., as a legal policy counsel and lobbyist. From 1993 until 1995, Maya worked as a lecturer in law at the University of Transkei, as well as practicing as an advocate in Transkei.

Maya moved to the bench in 1999, first as an acting judge of the Mthatha High Court and then on the Labour Court in Grahamstown, Port Elizabeth, the Bisho High Court, the Supreme Court of Appeal from 2005, and the Constitutional Court in 2011. She served as acting Judge of the Supreme Court of Namibia in 2008) and the Appeals Court of Lesotho in 2015.

Maya was appointed President of South Africa's Supreme Court of Appeal in 2016, the first woman to hold the role.

Awards and honours
Maya holds honorary doctorates of law from a number of universities. She was elected the President of the South African Chapter of the International Association of Women Judges, and in 2012 received the South African Women Lawyers Icon award for her role in empowering and mentoring women in both the judiciary and the broader legal profession.

Personal life
Maya is married to Dabulamanzi Mlokoti and has three children.

References

1964 births
Living people
South African judges
Chancellors of the University of Mpumalanga